In chess, a pure mate is a checkmate position such that the mated king is attacked exactly once, and prevented from moving to any of the adjacent squares in its  for exactly one reason per square. Each of the squares in the mated king's field is attacked or "guarded" by one—and only one—attacking unit, or else a square which is not attacked is occupied by a friendly unit, a unit of the same color as the mated king. Some authors allow that special situations involving double check or pins may also be considered as pure mate.

Pure mates are of interest to chess problem composers for their aesthetic value. In real gameplay, their occurrence is incidental. Nevertheless, several famous games have concluded with a pure mate, including the Immortal Game and the Evergreen Game, both won by Adolf Anderssen; the Peruvian Immortal; and the Game of the Century, an early  won by Bobby Fischer.

Pure mate is one of a few terms used by composers to describe the properties of a checkmate position; related concepts include economical mate, model mate, and ideal mate. An economical mate is a position such that all of the attacker's pieces contribute to the checkmate, with the (optional) exception of the king and the pawns. The model mate and the ideal mate are both stronger forms of pure mate. When a checkmate is both "pure and economical", it is said to be a model mate. When, in a pure mate, all  on the board of either color plays a direct role in the checkmate, it is said to be an ideal mate.

Definitions
A pure mate is a checkmate position such that each of the squares in the king's field is guarded, attacked, or blocked in exactly one way, while the king itself is attacked exactly once. In practice, this means that for each of the squares in the king's field, there is exactly one reason why the mated king cannot be moved to that square to escape check. Some authors omit the detail that the mated king itself is attacked only once. In his Dictionary of Modern Chess, Byrne J. Horton provided the following definition:

Horton's definition assumes a historical norm in chess problems, in which White is the attacking and mating side, while Black is the mated and losing side. However, the concept of a pure mate is also applicable to positions in which Black is the mating side.

In the Oxford Companion to Chess, David Hooper and Kenneth Whyld gave a more complex definition, allowing for exceptions in the cases of pins and double check:

Examples

Steinkühler vs. Blackburne, 1863

After providing their own definition, Hooper and Whyld cited a  won by Joseph Henry Blackburne against Alexander Steinkühler as an example of pure mate with Black as the mating side. Playing as Black and beginning with Black's 19th move, Blackburne initiated an attack on White's  consisting of three consecutive checks (19...Qxf2+ 20.Kh1 Qg1+ 21.Rxg1 Nf2+ 22.Kg2) such that after each check, White had exactly one legal  response, involving a queen sacrifice. Black then played his only available check (and mate) 22...Bh3#, a pure mate in which Black's knight, light-squared bishop and king's rook  with each other to give mate.

In the final position, the White king occupied a square away from the board's edge, such that its field consisted of the maximum eight squares. The three squares g1, h2 and g3 were blocked by friendly pieces (referred to by Hooper and Whyld as self-blocks), none of which were also attacked by opposing units. h1 and h3 were attacked (or guarded) by the knight, and f3 and f2 were attacked (or guarded) by the king's rook. The square f1 is not attacked by the rook (the knight limits its line of attack), however it is guarded by the bishop in that although the bishop may be said not to attack the square in the given position, the king is nevertheless prevented from fleeing along the bishop's line of attack, as it would remain in check. For this reason, some authors prefer to use the word "guarded" rather than "attacked" to describe such limitations on the king's movement. In any case, the king itself is attacked exactly once by the bishop, and is prevented from moving to any of the squares in its field for exactly one reason per square. Although it is a pure mate, the position is not an economical mate, as Black's queen's rook does not contribute to the checkmate. It is therefore also not a model mate. Since several other units on the board do not directly contribute to the checkmate, the position is also not an ideal mate.

The "Game of the Century"

In 1956, Bobby Fischer, a 13-year-old boy and future world champion, won a famous game against the master player Donald Byrne, establishing himself as a skilled player. Following an early queen sacrifice, Fischer coordinated his pieces to win a rook, two bishops, and a pawn for the sacrificed queen, thus gaining a winning material advantage.

In professional chess, when a game is clearly lost, it is customary for the losing player to resign rather than play until checkmate, both out of respect for one's opponent and also to avoid the tedium of forcing the opponent to play until checkmate, which the winning player may view as poor sportsmanship. However, Byrne is supposed to have conferred with some of his fellow players, deciding to play until checkmate for the same reason that most players resign ahead of time: as a sign of respect for Fischer's skill and also to allow the young Fischer the satisfaction of mate. The final result was a pure mate, with a black rook, bishop and knight trapping the white king against the edge of the board.

The "Immortal Game"

The Immortal Game was a casual game played by Adolf Anderssen and Lionel Kieseritzky in 1851. Anderssen allowed a double rook sacrifice in order to develop an attack using his remaining . Hooper, Whyld and Kasparov report that Kieseritzky resigned the game following 20.Ke2. However, the continuation 20...Na6 21.Nxg7+ Kd8 22.Qf6+ Nxf6 23.Be7# is commonly reported in treatments of the game. If played, this continuation would have resulted in a model mate. Kasparov described the continuation as being both "pure" and "economic", two adjectives which, taken together, are synonymous with a model mate.

Non-examples

Non-examples of pure mate have been composed. In the given non-example, the black king cannot move to e5 for two reasons: it is attacked by both the white queen and the white rook. The black king also cannot move to c5 for two reasons, as the square is attacked by the white queen and guarded by the white rook. The black king also cannot move to c4 for two reasons. The square is occupied by a friendly bishop, but even if it weren't, it is also attacked by the white king.

Exceptions for double check and pins
Some authors allow exceptional cases involving double check and pins to count as pure mates, even if they violate the basic concept that each square of the field (and the king's square itself) is covered exactly once. Such exceptions are allowed if the existence of a double check or a pin is necessary in order for the position to be a checkmate, preventing the mated party from responding to the check, which they might otherwise have done.  

In chess composition, the aesthetic concept which allows for this expanded definition of pure mate is called economy of force. Economy of force refers to the idea that a chess composition is simpler and more beautiful when it uses minimal material to maximal effect, e.g. in a checkmate or some particular tactic. Ideally, in order to avoid redundancy, no more than one unit should attack a given square. But if the minimum force necessary in order to ensure checkmate requires a double check or a pin, then the resulting position may be regarded as a pure mate.

In the position at left, Black has been mated by a double check. Every square of the king's field is attacked, guarded, or blocked exactly once. However, the king's square itself is attacked twice. In a double check, it is impossible for a defender to block or capture both attackers simultaneously. Therefore the king must move, and in the given position, it cannot. If the position were not a double check, then the black queen would be able to deal with either check, either by interposing between the rook and the king at e5, between the bishop and the king at e4, or else by capturing the rook at f5. Double check prevents the queen from moving at all. The fact that the position is a double check is necessary in order for it to be a checkmate, and therefore some authors allow it as a pure mate.

In the position at right, Black has been mated by the knight at e3. Every square in the king's field and the king's square itself are each covered exactly once, with one exception. The black king cannot move to e4 for two reasons: the square is occupied by a friendly rook, but even if it weren't, the square is also attacked by the white bishop, which pins the rook to its king. However, the fact that the rook is pinned is necessary in order for the position to be a checkmate. If the rook were not pinned, it would be able to deal with the check by capturing the knight at e3. Both of these examples satisfy Hooper and Whyld's expanded definition of pure mate.

Non-examples
In the position at left, White can play 1.Re8#. If this move is played, Black will be mated by double check. The position might be a pure mate, except that a8 is attacked twice, by both the white rook and bishop. Even if the resulting position were not a double check, Black has no way of addressing either or both attacks. In other words, it was not necessary to play the double check in order to prevent Black from capturing an attacker or interposing into a line of attack. Therefore, the double check would represent additional and unnecessary attacking force, above the minimum required for mate and contrary to the concept of economy of force. Thus, the position following 1.Re8# fails to satisfy Hooper and Whyld's definition of a pure mate. White could instead play 1.Qc8#, a genuine pure mate delivered by an unassisted queen.

In the position at right, White can play 1.Bd5#. If this move is played, Black will be mated in a position involving a pinned piece in the king's field. The position might be a pure mate, except that a7 is both occupied by a friendly pawn and also attacked by the white queen. The pin is unnecessary to the checkmate, because even if the pawn were not pinned, it would still not be able to capture the attacking bishop or to interpose in the bishop's line of attack. If, after 1.Bd5#, the white queen were removed from the board, the position would still be a checkmate. Therefore, the pin represents additional and unnecessary attacking force, above the minimum required for mate and contrary to the concept of economy of force. Thus, the position fails to satisfy Hooper and Whyld's definition of a pure mate. White could instead play 1.Qd5#, simultaneously unpinning the black pawn and delivering a genuine pure mate.

Notes

References

Bibliography
 
 

Chess checkmates
Chess problems